is a 2003 novel by Ranzō Ōta. It has been adapted into a film by Isshin Inudo in 2004.

Film Adaptation
 Blooming Again directed by Isshin Inudo, a Toei production in 2004, it stars Tsutomu Yamazaki. Hisaya Morishige and Takuya Fujioka made their final film appearance in the film.

Cast
 Tsutomu Yamazaki as Makoto Kikushima
 Ken Utsui as Kōtarō Inō
 Yukio Aoshima as Yoshio Nagaike
 Kei Tani as Shōji
 Isamu Nagato as Rokubei Sakiyama
 Takuya Fujioka as Kinzō Genda
 Asei Kobayashi as Shujirō Akahoshi
 Chieko Matsubara as Suzuko Asuka
 Haruko Katō as Sadako Tōyama
 Hisaya Morishige as Rokusaburō Aoki

References

External links
Blooming Again at Toei Video

2003 Japanese novels
Novels set in Japan
Films based on Japanese novels
Japanese novels adapted into films
2004 films